Saint-Étienne-des-Grès/Hydravion Adventure Water Aerodrome  is located on the Saint-Maurice River,  southeast of Saint-Boniface, Quebec, Canada on the Saint-Maurice River.

References

Registered aerodromes in Mauricie
Seaplane bases in Quebec